Saint Louis School, Chachoengsao (SLC) is a private Catholic school in  Chachoengsao, Thailand. The school was established to teach students from the Kindergarten level to Primary level to Secondary Level (Grades 1-12). It is located at 128 Suppakit Street, Na Mueang, Mueang Chachoengsao District.

History 
St. Louis School Chachoengsao is part of the St. Gabriel Foundation of Thailand. When the school first opened, it only accepted boys until the year 1979, after which female students were accepted in kindergarten. Since then, St. Louis School continuous to be a coeducational school.

School's Philosophy 
The aim of life is to know the real truth and access to justice as a noble origin of life. Every man must work, perseverance is the way to success. This philosophy is capsulized in the school's motto, "Labor Omnia Vincit". The English translation is "Work conquers all"

Identity 
St. Louis School Chachoengsao focuses on developing language technologies for students.

References

External links 
 Saint Louis School

Catholic schools in Thailand